Arrandale is a settlement in British Columbia, located approximately 74 km north of Prince Rupert.

A salmon cannery operated at Arrandale from 1904 to 1942. It was located at the mouth of the Nass River, and employed Nisga'a people who lived in the villages along the Nass.

Notable residents 
 Birthplace of Joseph Gosnell, Nisga'a leader

References 

Settlements in British Columbia